The Alphabet Historic District, is a historic district in the Northwest District of Portland, Oregon which was listed on the National Register of Historic Places in 2000. It is roughly bounded by NW Lovejoy St., NW Marshall St., NW 17th Ave., W. Burnside St., and NW 24th Ave.

It is an area zoned for historic preservation, about 50 blocks in size, extending roughly between NW 17th and 24th Avenues, and between W Burnside and NW Marshall Streets.

In 2000, the Alphabet Historic District, which covers parts of streets from Burnside ("B Street") to N.W. Marshall ("M Street") within the Alphabet District but not further, was added to the National Register of Historic Places.

The district includes about 50 buildings which are separately listed on the National Register. These include:
George F. Heusner House
Tudor Arms Apartments, designed by Carl L. Linde
Trinity Place Apartments, luxury apartments including servants quarters
Couch School
Temple Beth Israel, designed by Edgar M. Lazarus

It also includes at least eight Portland Historic Landmarks:
Lesser Cohen House
Richard Koehler House
C. H. Korell Houses#3 and 4
Abbott Mills House
Pope Investment Property
St. Francis Apartments
St. Mark's Episcopal Church

It includes or has other association with Portland West End Historic District and Portland Nob Hill Historic District.

Architect: William B. Bell et al.
Architecture: Queen Anne, Bungalow/craftsman, et al.
Historic function: Domestic; Social; Religion; Commerce/trade
Historic subfunction: Single Dwelling; Multiple Dwelling; Civic; Religious Structure; Business
Criteria: event, person, architecture/engineering

References

External links

National Register of Historic Places in Multnomah County, Oregon
Historic districts on the National Register of Historic Places in Oregon